Bartłomiej Olszewski (born 29 January 1996) is a Polish professional footballer who plays as a left-back for Stal Stalowa Wola.

References

External links

1996 births
Living people
Polish footballers
Association football defenders
Górnik Zabrze players
MKS Kluczbork players
MKP Pogoń Siedlce players
Stal Stalowa Wola players
Ekstraklasa players
I liga players
II liga players
III liga players
People from Lubaczów